Niv Sultan (born 16 September 1992) is an Israeli actress. She is known for starring in the Apple TV+ Israeli series Tehran.

Early life and background 
Sultan was born in Jerusalem, Israel, to a Moroccan Jewish family. Her parents immigrated from Morocco. After serving as a soldier in the Israel Defense Forces, she attended acting classes for three years in Tel Aviv, Israel.

Career 
Sultan was chosen as the lead role in the Apple TV+ Israeli espionage television series Tehran, where she stars as Tamar Rabinyan, a Mossad agent working a ground operation in Tehran, Iran.

During an interview with The Natural Aristocrat, Niv Sultan commented on why she loves portraying Tamar Rabinyan on Apple TV+ Israeli series Tehran:

Other work 
Sultan is the owner of Sultana, a jewelry company, together with her sisters Bar and May.

Since 2021, she has been a brand ambassador for Samsung in Israel.

Personal life 
Sultan married fellow actor Maor Schwitzer in March of 2022. They met on the set of the show יש לה את זה (She Has It) in 2018, where they played an engaged couple.

Filmography

Film

Television

See also 
 List of Israeli actors

References

External links 
 

Living people
21st-century Israeli actresses
Actresses from Jerusalem
Israeli film actresses
Jewish Israeli actresses
Israeli Sephardi Jews
Israeli people of Moroccan-Jewish descent
Israeli Mizrahi Jews
1992 births